Allium trifurcatum is a plant species native to the Sichuan and Yunnan regions in southern China. It grows at elevations of 3000–4000 m. The Tibetan people of Shangri-La and nearby areas eat its scapes.

Allium trifurcatum has thick roots and clusters of bulbs. Scape is up to 20 cm tall, round in cross-section. Leaves are flat, up to 10 mm across, shorter than the scape. Umbels have only a few white flowers.

References

trifurcatum
Onions
Flora of China
Flora of Yunnan
Flora of Sichuan
Plants described in 1991
Plants described in 1980